The canton of Gascogne-Auscitaine is an administrative division of the Gers department, southwestern France. It was created at the French canton reorganisation which came into effect in March 2015. Its seat is in Preignan.

Composition

It consists of the following communes:
 
Antras
Augnax
Biran
Bonas
Castillon-Massas
Castin
Crastes
Duran
Jegun
Lavardens
Mérens
Mirepoix
Montaut-les-Créneaux
Ordan-Larroque
Peyrusse-Massas
Preignan
Puycasquier
Roquefort
Roquelaure
Sainte-Christie
Saint-Lary
Tourrenquets

Councillors

Pictures of the canton

References

Cantons of Gers